The Fifteenth Legislative Assembly of Andhra Pradesh was formed by the members elected in the 2019 Andhra Pradesh Legislative Assembly election. Election to Andhra Pradesh Legislative Assembly took place in single phase on 11th April 2019 by the Election Commission of India. Counting started officially on the morning of 23 May 2019 and the results were declared on the same day.

Members

Party-wise distribution of seats

List of members

Anantapur

Chittoor

East Godavari

Guntur

Krishna

Kurnool

Prakasam

Sri Potti Sriramulu Nellore

Srikakulam

Visakhapatnam

Vizianagaram

West Godavari

YSR

See also

 Andhra Pradesh Legislature

Footnotes

References

External links 
 Official website of the Election Commission of India

2010s in Andhra Pradesh
Andhra Pradesh
 
Andhra Pradesh Legislative Assembly